Tax Freedom Day is a concept developed and trademarked by American businessman Dallas Hostetler, which aims to calculate the first day of the year on which a nation as a whole has theoretically earned enough income to pay its taxes. Every dollar that is officially considered income by the government is counted, and every payment to the government that is officially considered a tax is counted. Taxes at all levels of government – local, state and federal – are included.

History and methodology 
The concept of Tax Freedom Day was developed in 1948 by Florida businessman Dallas Hostetler, who trademarked the phrase "Tax Freedom Day" and calculated it each year for the next two decades. In 1971, Hostetler retired and transferred the trademark to the Tax Foundation.

United States

In the United States, the "Tax Freedom Day" is annually calculated by the Tax Foundation, a Washington, D.C.-based think tank. Their results are as follows:

Around the world
Many other companies and organizations in countries throughout the world now produce their own "Tax Freedom Day" analysis. According to the Tax Foundation, Tax Freedom Day reports are currently being published in eight countries. Due to the different ways that nations collect and categorize public finance data, however, Tax Freedom Days are not necessarily directly comparable from one country to another.

European Union

A 2010 study published in L'Anglophone, a Brussels newspaper, compared the tax burdens of "Average Joes" in each of the 27 EU member states and projected the Tax Freedom Day for workers earning a typical wage. Income taxes, social security contributions (by the employee and the employer) and projected VAT contributions were included in the calculations.

Regarding the discrepancy between their calculation of August 3 as the typical Belgian worker's Tax Freedom Day and that of PriceWaterhouseCoopers (PWC), L'Anglophone's authors wrote:

Criticism
In the book Filthy Lucre: Economics for People Who Hate Capitalism, philosopher Joseph Heath criticizes the idea that tax-paying is inherently different from consumption:
It would make just as much sense to declare an annual "mortgage freedom day", in order to let mortgage owners know what day they "stop working for the bank and start working for themselves". ...But who cares? Homeowners are not really "working for the bank"; they're merely financing their own consumption. After all, they're the ones living in the house, not the bank manager.

Mathematical
For Canada, the Fraser Institute also includes a "Personal Tax Freedom Day Calculator" that estimates a customized Tax Freedom Day based on additional variables such as age of household head, sex of household head, marital status and number of children. However, the Fraser Institute's figures have been disputed. For example, a 2005 study by Osgoode Hall Law Professor Neil Brooks argued that the Fraser Institute's Tax Freedom Day analysis includes flawed accounting, including the exclusion of several important forms of income and overstating tax figures, moving the date nearly two months later.

In America, while Tax Freedom Day presents an "average American" tax burden, it is not a tax burden typical for an American. That is, the tax burdens of most Americans are substantially overstated by Tax Freedom Day. The larger tax bills associated with higher incomes increases the average tax burden above that of most Americans.

The Tax Foundation defends its methodology by pointing out that Tax Freedom Day is the U.S. economy's overall average tax burden—not the tax burden of the "average" American, which is how it is often misinterpreted by members of the media. Tax Foundation materials do not use the phrase "tax burden of the average American", although members of the media often make this mistake.

Another criticism is that the calculation includes capital gains taxes but not capital gains income, thus overstating the tax burden. For example, in the late 1990s the US Tax Freedom Day moved later, reaching its latest date ever in 2000, but this was largely due to capital gains taxes on the bull market of that era rather than an increase in tax rates. In other words, variations in capital gains income and their associated taxes cause changes in the amount of taxes, but not in the income used in the calculation of Tax Freedom Day.

The Tax Foundation argues that the Tax Freedom Day calculation does not include capital gains as income because it uses income and tax data directly from the Bureau of Economic Analysis (BEA). BEA has never counted capital gains as income since they don't represent current production available to pay taxes, and so the Tax Foundation excludes them as well. Additionally, the Tax Foundation argues that the exclusion of capital gains income is irrelevant in most years since including capital gains would only shift Tax Freedom Day by 1 percent in either direction in most years. A 1 percent change would represent 3.65 days. From 1968 to 2009 the date has never left the 21-day range of April 13 to May 3.

See also 
 List of countries by tax rates
 List of countries by tax revenue as percentage of GDP
 Rahn curve
 Government spending
 Laffer curve

Notes

External links 
 Tax Foundation's Tax Freedom Day (US only)
 Tax Freedom Day Clock A live clock that counts the days till/since Tax Freedom Day for USA only.
 Tax Freedom Day Clock (UK) A live clock that counts the days till/since UK Tax Freedom Day
 Criticism: Tax Foundation Figures Do Not Represent Typical Households’ Tax Burdens
 Response to Criticism: Tax Freedom Day: A Description of Its Calculation and Answers to Some Methodological Questions

Tax
Unofficial observances
Libertarian terms